Mouthfeel refers to the physical sensations in the mouth caused by food or drink, making it distinct from taste. It is a fundamental sensory attribute which, along with taste and smell, determines the overall flavor of a food item. Mouthfeel is also sometimes referred to as texture. 

It is used in many areas related to the testing and evaluating of foodstuffs, such as wine-tasting and food rheology.  It is evaluated from initial perception on the palate, to first bite, through chewing to swallowing and aftertaste. In wine-tasting, for example, mouthfeel is usually used with a modifier (big, sweet, tannic, chewy, etc.) to the general sensation of the wine in the mouth. Research indicates texture and mouthfeel can also influence satiety with the effect of viscosity most significant. 

Mouthfeel is often related to a product's water activity—hard or crisp products having lower water activities and soft products having intermediate to high water activities.

Qualities perceived 

 Chewiness: The sensation of sustained, elastic resistance from food while it is chewed.
Cohesiveness: Degree to which the sample deforms before rupturing when biting with molars.
 Crunchiness: The audible grinding of a food when it is chewed.
Density: Compactness of cross section of the sample after biting completely through with the molars.
 Dryness: Degree to which the sample feels dry in the mouth.
 Exquisiteness: Perceived quality of the item in question.
 Fracturability: Force with which the sample crumbles, cracks or shatters. Fracturability encompasses crumbliness, crispiness, crunchiness and brittleness.
 Graininess: Degree to which a sample contains small grainy particles.
 Gumminess: Energy required to disintegrate a semi-solid food to a state ready for swallowing.
 Hardness: Force required to deform the product to a given distance, i.e., force to compress between molars, bite through with incisors, compress between tongue and palate.
 Heaviness: Weight of product perceived when first placed on tongue.
 Moisture absorption: Amount of saliva absorbed by product.
 Moisture release: Amount of wetness/juiciness released from sample.
 Mouthcoating: Type and degree of coating in the mouth after mastication (for example, fat/oil).
 Roughness: Degree of abrasiveness of product's surface perceived by the tongue.
 Slipperiness: Degree to which the product slides over the tongue.
 Smoothness: Absence of any particles, lumps, bumps, etc., in the product.
 Uniformity: Degree to which the sample is even throughout; homogeneity.
 Uniformity of bite: Evenness of force through bite.
 Uniformity of chew: Degree to which the chewing characteristics of the product are even throughout mastication.
 Viscosity: Force required to draw a liquid from a spoon over the tongue.
 Wetness: Amount of moisture perceived on product's surface.

See also
Food
Psychorheology
Texture
Umami
Wine tasting
Q. texture

References

Further reading
 Dollase, Jürgen, Geschmacksschule [engl.: Tasting School], 2005 Tre Tori, Wiesbaden, Germany. German-language textbook by a renowned food critic covering some, but not all of the above mentionend properties/mouthfeelings.

External links
 Snack Foods and Water Activity

Food science
Gustatory system
Sensory systems
Wine tasting
Characteristics of cheese